The 2020–21 Florida State Seminoles women's basketball team, variously Florida State or FSU, represented Florida State University during the 2020–21 NCAA Division I women's basketball season. Florida State competed in Division I of the National Collegiate Athletic Association (NCAA). The Seminoles played their home games at the Donald L. Tucker Center on the university's Tallahassee, Florida campus. They were members of the Atlantic Coast Conference.

Brooke Wyckoff served as the interim head coach for the season as Sue Semrau took the season off to care for her mother.

The Seminoles finished the season 10–9 and 9–7 in ACC play to finish in a tie for fourth place.  As the fourth seed in the ACC tournament, they lost to Syracuse in the Quarterfinals.  The Seminoles went on to make the NCAA tournament for the eighth consecutive season.  As the nine seed in the HemisFair Regional the lost to Oregon State in the First Round.

Previous season
For the 2019–20 season, the Seminoles finished with a record of 24–8, 11–7 in the ACC, finishing in fourth place. Florida State reached the finals of the ACC tournament, finishing as runner-up. The NCAA tournament was canceled due to the coronavirus outbreak. Senior Forward Kiah Gillespie went on to be selected in the third round of the 2020 WNBA draft.

Off-season

Departures

Incoming transfers

Recruiting Class
Florida State did not have any incoming freshman commits.

Roster

Schedule and results

Source:

|-
!colspan=12 style="background:#; color:white;"| Non-Conference Regular season

|-
!colspan=12 style="background:#; color:white;"| ACC Regular season

|-
!colspan=12 style="background:#; color:white;"| ACC Women's Tournament

|-
!colspan=12 style="background:#; color:white;"| NCAA Women's Tournament

|-

Rankings

Honors

All-ACC

First Team
Morgan Jones
Defensive Team
Morgan Jones

References

External links
 

Florida State Seminoles women's basketball
Florida State
Florida State Seminoles women's basketball seasons
Florida State